YRU Still Here? is a studio album by American guitarist Marc Ribot's Ceramic Dog which was released in April 2018 on Northern Spy Records.

Reception

The Allmusic review awarded the album 4½ stars out of 5 with Matt Collar stating, "the pugilistic, stylistically expansive third album from Ceramic Dog, guitarist/singer Ribot's punk-infused trio with bassist/singer Shahzad Ismaily and drummer/singer Ches Smith. Grounded by Ribot's mutative, buzzy guitar lines and the band's taut, often humorous lyrics piping with literate rage, YRU Still Here? has the feel of an '80s hardcore punk 7" recorded on a four-track over an intense few hours. While the band's dissonant, MC5-esque brand of punk, improvisational jazz, and avant-garde rock has always evinced a kind of leftist artistic ire, it's never been as overtly politically and socially minded as it is here".

PopMatters' John Garratt rated the album 8 out of 10, saying, "Ceramic Dog slammed their collective hand onto a truly volatile moment to capture some appropriately volatile music. In a time when nationalism seems to be far too en vouge for comfort, you can always count on certain voices being raised (shouted?). Ribot was one of those voices before, and there's no way he's going to shut up now. ... the album's undercurrent muddies the water just enough to remind the listener that Marc Ribot and Ceramic Dog will never take the easy way out, even during the best of times. Sometimes, that's how you stumble upon a future classic".

Track listing

Personnel
Ceramic Dog
 Marc Ribot – guitar, Requinto guitar, Farfisa organ,bass, horn, vocoder, vocals
 Shahzad Ismaily – bass, Moog synthesizer, percussion, vocals
 Ches Smith – drums, percussion, electronics, vocals

Additional musicians
 Curtis Fowlkes – trombone (tracks 2 & 7)
 Doug Wieselman – saxophone, flute (tracks 2 & 8) 
 Briggan Krauss – saxophone (track 6)
 Neel Murgai – sitar (track 9)
 Mauricio Herrera – congas (track 2)
 Lukas Rutzen (tracks 2 & 8), Rea Dubach (tracks 2, 6 & 8) – backing vocals

Production
 Ron Saint Germain – mixing
 Scott Hull – mastering

References

2018 albums
Marc Ribot albums
Northern Spy Records albums